The Malayo-Polynesian languages are a subgroup of the Austronesian languages, with approximately 385.5 million speakers. The Malayo-Polynesian languages are spoken by the Austronesian peoples outside of Taiwan, in the island nations of Southeast Asia (Indonesian and Philippine Archipelago) and the Pacific Ocean, with a smaller number in continental Asia in the areas near the Malay Peninsula. Cambodia, Vietnam and the Chinese island Hainan serve as the northwest geographic outlier. Malagasy, spoken in the island of Madagascar off the eastern coast of Africa in the Indian Ocean, is the furthest western outlier.

Many languages of the Malayo-Polynesian family show the strong influence of Sanskrit and Arabic, as the western part of the region has been a stronghold of Hinduism, Buddhism, and, later, Islam. 

Two morphological characteristics of the Malayo-Polynesian languages are a system of affixation and reduplication (repetition of all or part of a word, such as wiki-wiki) to form new words. Like other Austronesian languages, they have small phonemic inventories; thus a text has few but frequent sounds. The majority also lack consonant clusters. Most also have only a small set of vowels, five being a common number.

Major languages

All major and official Austronesian languages belong to the Malayo-Polynesian subgroup. Malayo-Polynesian languages with more than five million speakers are: Indonesian, Javanese, Sundanese, Tagalog, Malagasy, Malay, Cebuano, Madurese, Ilocano, Hiligaynon, and Minangkabau.
Among the remaining more than 1,000 languages, several have national/official language status, e.g. Tongan, Samoan, Māori, Gilbertese, Fijian, Hawaiian, Palauan, and Chamorro.

Typological characteristics

Terminology
The term "Malayo-Polynesian" was originally coined in 1841 by Franz Bopp as the name for the Austronesian language family as a whole, and until the mid-20th century (after the introduction of the term "Austronesian" by Wilhelm Schmidt in 1906), "Malayo-Polynesian" and "Austronesian" were used as synonyms. The current use of "Malayo-Polynesian" denoting the subgroup comprising all Austronesian languages outside of Taiwan was introduced in the 1970s, and has eventually become standard terminology in Austronesian studies.

Classification

Relation to Austronesian languages on Taiwan
In spite of a few features shared with the Eastern Formosan languages (such as the merger of proto-Austronesian *t, *C to /t/), there is no conclusive evidence that would link the Malayo-Polynesian languages to any one of the primary branches of Austronesian on Taiwan.

Internal classification
Malayo-Polynesian consists of a large number of small local language clusters, with the one exception being Oceanic, the only large group which is universally accepted; its parent language Proto-Oceanic has been reconstructed in all aspects of its structure (phonology, lexicon, morphology and syntax). All other large groups within Malayo-Polynesian are controversial.

The most influential proposal for the internal subgrouping of the Malayo-Polynesian languages was made by Robert Blust who presented several papers advocating a division into two major branches, viz. Western Malayo-Polynesian and Central-Eastern Malayo-Polynesian.

Central-Eastern Malayo-Polynesian is widely accepted as a subgroup, although some objections have been raised against its validity as a genetic subgroup. On the other hand, Western Malayo-Polynesian is now generally held (including by Blust himself) to be an umbrella term without genetic relevance. Taking into account the Central-Eastern Malayo-Polynesian hypothesis, the Malayo-Polynesian languages can be divided into the following subgroups (proposals for larger subgroups are given below):

Philippine (disputed)
Batanic languages
Northern Luzon
Central Luzon
Northern Mindoro
Greater Central Philippine
Kalamian
South Mindanao (also called Bilic languages)
Sangiric
Minahasan
Umiray Dumaget
Manide–Alabat
Ati
Klata
Sama–Bajaw
North Bornean
Northeast Sabahan
Southwest Sabahan
North Sarawak
Kayan–Murik
Land Dayak
Barito (including Malagasy)
Moken–Moklen
Malayo-Chamic
Northwest Sumatra–Barrier Islands (probably including the Enggano language)
Rejang
Lampung-Komering
Sundanese
Javanese
Madurese
Bali-Sasak-Sumbawa
Celebic
South Sulawesi
Palauan
Chamorro
Central–Eastern Malayo-Polynesian
Central Malayo-Polynesian (dubious)
Sumba–Flores
Flores–Lembata
Selaru
Kei–Tanimbar
Aru
Central Maluku
Timoric (also called Timor–Babar languages)
Kowiai
Teor-Kur
Eastern Malayo-Polynesian (dubious)
South Halmahera–West New Guinea
Oceanic (approximately 450 languages)

Nasal
The position of the recently rediscovered Nasal language (spoken on Sumatra) is unclear; it shares features of lexicon and phonology with both Lampung and Rejang.

Enggano
Edwards (2015) argues that Enggano is a primary branch of Malayo-Polynesian. However, this is disputed by Smith (2017), who considers Enggano to have undergone significant internal changes, but to have once been much more like other Sumatran languages in Sumatra.

Philippine languages

The status of the Philippine languages as subgroup of Malayo-Polynesian is disputed. While many scholars (such as Robert Blust) support a genealogical subgroup that includes the languages of the Philippines and northern Sulawesi, Reid (2018) rejects the hypothesis of a single Philippine subgroup, but instead argues that the Philippine branches represent first-order subgroups directly descended from Proto-Malayo-Polynesian.

(Zobel 2002)  
Zobel (2002) proposes a Nuclear Malayo-Polynesian subgroup, based on putative shared innovations in the Austronesian alignment and syntax found throughout Indonesia apart from much of Borneo and the north of Sulawesi. This subgroup comprises the languages of the Greater Sunda Islands (Malayo-Chamic, Northwest Sumatra–Barrier Islands, Lampung, Sundanese, Javanese, Madurese, Bali-Sasak-Sumbawa) and most of Sulawesi (Celebic, South Sulawesi), Palauan, Chamorro and the Central–Eastern Malayo-Polynesian languages. This hypothesis is one of the few attempts to link certain Western Malayo-Polynesian languages with the Central-Eastern Malayo-Polynesian languages in a higher intermediate subgroup, but has received little further scholarly attention.

Malayo-Sumbawan (Adelaar 2005)

The Malayo-Sumbawan languages are a proposal by K. Alexander Adelaar (2005) which unites the Malayo-Chamic languages, the Bali-Sasak-Sumbawa languages, Madurese and Sundanese into a single subgroup based on phonological and lexical evidence.
Malayo-Sumbawan
Malayo-Chamic-BSS
Malayic
Chamic
Bali-Sasak-Sumbawa
Sundanese
Madurese

Greater North Borneo (Blust 2010; Smith 2017, 2017a)

The Greater North Borneo hypothesis, which unites all languages spoken on Borneo except for the Barito languages together with the Malayo-Chamic languages, Rejang and Sundanese into a single subgroup, was first proposed by Blust (2010) and further elaborated by Smith (2017, 2017a).

Greater North Borneo
North Borneo
Northeast Sabah
Southwest Sabah
North Sarawak
Kayan–Murik
Land Dayak
Malayo-Chamic
Moken (not included by Smith (2017))
Rejang
Sundanese

Because of the inclusion of Malayo-Chamic and Sundanese, the Greater North Borneo hypothesis is incompatible with Adelaar's Malayo-Sumbawan proposal. Consequently, Blust explicitly rejects Malayo-Sumbawan as a subgroup. The Greater North Borneo subgroup is based solely on lexical evidence.

Smith (2017) 
Based on a proposal initially brought forward by Blust (2010) as an extension of the Greater North Borneo hypothesis, Smith (2017) unites several Malayo-Polynesian subgroups in a "Western Indonesian" group, thus greatly reducing the number of primary branches of Malayo-Polynesian:

Western Indonesian
Greater North Borneo
North Borneo
Northeast Sabah
Southwest Sabah
North Sarawak
Central Sarawak
Kayanic
Land Dayak
Malayic
Chamic
Sundanese
Rejang
Greater Barito  (linkage)
Sama–Bajaw
Greater Barito  (paraphyletic linkage)
Lampung
Javanese
Madurese
Bali-Sasak-Sumbawa
Sumatran(an extended version of Northwest Sumatra–Barrier Islands that also comprises Nasal; the question of internal subgrouping is left open by Smith)
Celebic
South Sulawesi
Palauan
Chamorro
Moklenic
Central–Eastern Malayo-Polynesian
Philippine (linkage)(according to Smith, "not a subgroup as much as a loosely related group of languages that may contain multiple primary branches")

See also
Austronesian peoples

References

External links

2008 Austronesian Basic Vocabulary Database analysis
History.com Encyclopedia: Malayo-Polynesian Languages

 
Oceanian culture
Languages of Southeast Asia